The Poznań International Fair (PIF) is the biggest industrial fair in Poland. It is held on the Poznań fairground in Poland. Poznań International Fair is located in the centre of the city opposite the main railway station – Poznań Główny, in the centre of Poland and in the centre of Europe.

Typically, there are about 13,200 exhibitors including about 3,000 foreign companies from 70 countries of the world participating in 80 trade fair events organized on the grounds of the Poznań fair.

History

The idea of organising a modern fair by Polish manufacturers and merchants had its origins during the congress of the Union of Merchant Associations held in Poznań in 1917. The Union was an organisation of Polish merchants from Greater Poland and Eastern Pomerania. The fair was required to be of an international character and organised like the Leipzig Trade Fair. The first Poznań Trade Fair (I Targ Poznański), as it was called, took place in 1921 (from 28 May till 5 June), and the first chairman was Mieczysław Krzyżankiewicz.
Before 1924, only Polish companies, companies from Free City of Gdańsk and foreign companies with branches in Poland which were represented by Polish citizens could participate. During 1924, agreements were signed with companies from Czechoslovakia, France, Yugoslavia, Latvia, Germany, Romania, Switzerland, and Sweden, so that the first really international fair took place in 1925.
In 1927 the PIF was accepted as a member of the UFI.

The intensive developments of the 1920s were crowned by the huge General National Exhibition of 1929 that was visited by 4,5 mln people. This was the year that the Great Depression began. Despite the difficult economic situation, the PIF survived and at the end of the interbellum it was one of largest companies of its kind in Europe. During World War II, the company ceased to exist, its infrastructure was confiscated, and turned into a factory of Focke-Wulf, which made the PIF a military target for the Allied air forces. This led to great destruction of its infrastructure in 1945. During the war 85% of the PIF was destroyed, but despite this damage, the first postwar exhibition took place in 1946 and one year later, in 1947, the PIF had already regained its international character. In 1990 the Poznań International Fair transformed into a limited liability company with the State Treasure as one of its shareholders Since then the PIF is continuing to expand and enlarge its exhibition space.

Poznań International Fair today
Today the PIF is the largest trade fair organizer in Poland (by over 50% of total exhibition area and over 60% of exhibitors). It is the 21st largest fair in the world, with about 50 trade events taking place on its area every year. Area of PIF is over  indoor and  outdoor exhibition space. PIF a is state-owned company – 60% of shares belong to Polish State Treasury, and 40% to the City of Poznań. MTP organises expositions of Polish leaders at over 50 renowned trade shows and exhibitions abroad in such countries as: Germany, Russia, Ukraine, Georgia, Czech Republic, Croatia, Bulgaria, Romania, Uzbekistan, Kazakhstan and Azerbaijan.

MTP has foreign representative offices all over the world. The World Expo Company is an official representative office of MTP Group in Ukraine and works on such exhibitions as Budma and other. Every year, MTP organises over 1,600 congresses, conferences and workshops and hosts about 100,000 participants at these events.

List of annual exhibitions organized by the PIF

 Polagra AGRO-PREMIERY – International Trade Fair of Agricultural Mechanization
 AQUA-SAN – Bathroom and Wellness Exhibition
 BAKEPOL – Trade Fair for the Bakery Industry in Kielce
 Bezpieczeństwo Pracy w Przemyśle – Work Safety in Industry Exhibition
 Biuro – Fair of Office Furniture and Furnishing
 Body Style – Exhibition of Lingerie and Beach Fashion
 Budma – International Construction Fair
 Bumasz – International Fair for Construction Machines, Tools and Equipment
 BuyPoland – workshop for the tourism industry
 Dodatki do żywności – International Food Ingredients Show
 Home Decor – Exhibition of textiles, table and kitchen, light, interior design
 Drema – International Trade Fair of Machines and Tools for the Wood and Furniture Industries
 Targi Edukacyjne – Education Fair
 Energia – Power Industry Exhibition
 Eurofoto – Trade Fair of Photographic Products and Services
 Expopower – Power Industry Fair
 Farma – International Trade Fair of Animal Breeding, Horticulture and Rural Development
 Poznańskie Dni Mody – Fair of Clothing and Fabrics
 Festiwal Przedmiotów Artystycznych – Festival of Artistic Objects
 FIT-EXPO – Fair of Fitness and Body & Fashion
 Furnica – Trade Fair of Components for Furniture Production
 FurniFab – Furniture Fabric Show – Supply Show for the Upholstered Furniture Industry
 Gardenia – Garden Trade Fair
 Wiosenna Giełda Turystyczna – Spring Tourist Market
 Euro-Reklama GIFT EXPO – International Trade Fair of Advertising Goods and Services
 HiPeCo – International Trade Fair for Hygiene and Pest Control
 HOBBY – Salon Modelarstwa – Show of modellers
 Infosystem – Fair of IT Solution for industry and administration
 Instalacje – International Trade Fair for Installations and Equipment
 Intermasz – International Trade Fair of Textile, Clothes and Shoemaking Machines
 Investfield – Property and Investment Salon
 Gastro-Invest-Hotel – Exhibition of Products and Services for the Hotel and Catering Industry
 Targi Książki – Poznań Fair for Books for Children and Young People
 KWO – National Horticultural Exhibition
 KWZH – National Animal Breeding Exhibition
 Look – Hairdressing and Cosmetics Forum
 Mach-Tool – Machine Tools Exhibition
 Meble – Fair of Furniture and Furnishing
 Metalforum – Exhibition of Metallugrical, Foundry Engineering and Metallurgy Industry
 Motoryzacja – TTM – Automotive Technology Fair
 NA RYBY – Angling Equipment Trade Fair
 Natura Sanat – International Health Resort and Tourism Trade Fair in Polanica Zdrój
 Nauka dla gospodarki – Exhibition Science for the Economy
 Next Season – Fair of long-term contracts
 Poznański Salon Optyczny – Optical Salon
 Euro-Reklama OUTDOOR EXPO – International Trade Fair of Advertising Goods and Services
 Pakfood – Fair of Packaging for Food Industry
 PGA – Game Arena – Exhibition of video and computer games
 Polagra-Food – International Trade Fair for the Foodstuffs and Gastronomy
 Polagra-Tech – International Trade Fair of Food Processing Technologies Polagra-Tech
 Poleko – International Ecological Fair
 Poligrafia – International Fair of Printing Machines, Materials and Services
 Poznańskie Spotkanai Motoryyzacyjne – Automotive Industry Meetings
 Roltechnika – Exhibition of Agricultural Machines and Equipment – (takes place in  city quarter of Opole)
 Saldent – International Dentistry Fair
 SALMED – International Trade Fair of Medical Equipment
 Salus – Prevention and Health Care Forum and Exhibition
 Sawo – International Fair of Work Protection, Rescue and Fire-Fighting
 Securex – International Security Exhibition
 Targi Obuwia, Skóry i Wyrobów Skórzanych – Fair of Shoes, Leather and Leather goods
 Surfex – Exhibition of Surface Treatment Technologies
 Świat Dziecka – Trade Fair of Goods for Children
 Taropak – International Packaging Technology and Logistics Exhibition
 TECHNOGAZ – Petroleum and Gas Salon
 ITM – POLAND – Exhibition Innovations-Technologies-Machines
 Tour Salon – Fair of Regions and Tourist Products
 Translog – Fair of Logistic, Transport and Shipping
 LTS Transporta – Exhibition of Logistics, Transport and Shipping
 Targi Upominków i Dekoracji Światecznych – Gifts and Ornaments Trade Fair
 Welding – Exhibition of Welding Technologies

Notable architects of PIF buildings

 Hans Poelzig
 Roger Sławski
 Stefan Cybichowski

See also
 2008 United Nations Climate Change Conference
 Katowice International Fair, another large trade fair in Poland
 General National Exhibition in Lviv
 St. Dominic's Fair
 Targi Wschodnie
 Targi Północne
 Saint John's Fair, Poznań

Bibliography
 Jerzy Topolski, Lech Trzeciakowski (red) Dzieje Poznania, tom II cz. 1 1793–1918, Warszawa-Poznań 1994, Państwowe Wydawnictwo Naukowe 
 Jerzy Topolski, Lech Trzeciakowski (red) Dzieje Poznania, tom II cz. 2 1918–1945, Warszawa-Poznań 1998, Państwowe Wydawnictwo Naukowe 
 Zbigniew Zakrzewski, Przechadzki po Poznaniu lat miedzywojennych wyd. II, Warszawa-Poznań 1983, Państwowe Wydawnictwo Naukowe,

External links
 Homepage (English version)

1921 establishments in Poland
Fair
Trade fairs in Poland
Foreign trade of Poland